Scott Dan Sorensen (born 16 March 1993) is a New Zealand international rugby league footballer who plays as a  forward and  for the Penrith Panthers in the NRL. 

He is a dual NRL premiership winning player of 2021 and 2022. He previously played for the Cronulla-Sutherland Sharks in two separate spells as well as the Canberra Raiders in the National Rugby League.

Background
Sorensen was born in Sydney, New South Wales, Australia. He is the nephew of former Sharks players Kurt Sorensen and Dane Sorensen and grandson to Bill Sorensen, he is also the brother-in-law of Chad Townsend. Sorensen is of New Zealand, Tongan and Danish descent

Sorensen played his junior rugby league for the Cronulla-Caringbah Junior Rugby League Football Club, before being signed by the Cronulla-Sutherland Sharks.

Playing career

2013
In 2013, Sorensen played for the Cronulla-Sutherland Sharks' NYC team.

2014
In 2014, Sorensen graduated to Cronulla-Sutherland's New South Wales Cup team. In round 24 of the 2014 NRL season, he made his NRL debut for the Cronulla club against the Canberra Raiders.

2015
In 2015, Sorensen joined the South Sydney Rabbitohs.

2016
After failing to make a first-grade appearance for South Sydney, Sorensen joined Intrust Super Premiership NSW side Mount Pritchard Mounties in 2016. 

His form throughout the year secured him a contract with the Canberra Raiders starting in 2017.

2017
On 28 August, Sorensen was named on the interchange bench in the 2017 Intrust Super Premiership NSW Team of the Year. In October, he signed a 2-year contract to return to Cronulla in 2018.

2018
Sorensen played 15 games for Cronulla-Sutherland in the 2018 NRL season as the club finishing in the top four at seasons end.  Sorensen played in all three of the club's finals matches including the 22-6 preliminary final loss against Melbourne at AAMI Park.

2019
Sorensen made a total of five appearances for Cronulla in the 2019 NRL season.  Sorensen played for Cronulla's feeder side Newtown in their Canterbury Cup NSW grand final victory over the Wentworthville Magpies at Bankwest Stadium.

On 29 September 2019, Sorensen was named in the 2019 Canterbury Cup NSW team of the season.

The following week, Sorensen played for Newtown in the NRL State Championship victory over the Burleigh Bears at ANZ Stadium.

2020
He played 14 games for Cronulla in the 2020 NRL season as the club finished 8th and qualified for the finals.  He played in Cronulla's elimination final loss against Canberra.

2021
On 11 January, he signed a one-year deal with Penrith. He made his first appearance for the club in a round 9 match against his former team Cronulla-Sutherland off the interchange bench.

On July 28, Sorensen agreed to a two-year extension with Penrith, keeping him at the club until the end of 2023.

Sorensen played a total of 19 games for Penrith in the 2021 NRL season including the club's 2021 NRL Grand Final victory over South Sydney.

2022
Sorensen played 24 games for Penrith in the 2022 NRL season including the clubs 2022 NRL Grand Final victory over Paramatta where Sorensen scored a try.
As a result of Sorensen's good performances he was rewarded with the selection in the New Zealand 2021 Rugby League World Cup squad.

References

External links

Cronulla Sharks profile
Canberra Raiders profile

1993 births
Living people
Australian people of Danish descent
Australian people of New Zealand descent
Australian sportspeople of Tongan descent
Australian rugby league players
Canberra Raiders players
Cronulla-Sutherland Sharks players
Penrith Panthers players
North Sydney Bears NSW Cup players
Rugby league locks
Rugby league players from Sydney
Rugby league second-rows